Méhul is a French surname.

Notable people with this surname include:

 Étienne Méhul (1763–1817), French composer
 Joseph Daussoigne-Méhul (1790–1875), Belgian-French composer and music educator

See also
 Mehul, Indian given name

References